Beaton Hall Squires, LL.B, BA (December 16, 1881 - ?) was an All-American football player and a noted Canadian lawyer.  Born in rural Newfoundland, Squires became a star football player at Harvard and was selected by Walter Camp as his first-team All-American at the right guard position in 1905.  Squires received his law degree from Harvard and later became one of the leading solicitors in the Canadian province of Saskatchewan.

Harvard
Born in Newfoundland, Squires attended the public school in Newfoundland before enrolling at Harvard University.  He came to Harvard on a fellowship given by the Canadian government.  Squires received both BA and LL.B degrees from Harvard.

All-American football player
He played guard and tackle for the Harvard football team from 1903-1905.  Harvard coach Bill Reid kept a diary of the 1905 season that was published as a book in 1994.  Reid wrote that Squires was a big man who had worked his way through college working odd jobs.  Reid considered Squires "a thoroughly respectable and decent fellow, although he is perhaps a little thick headed."  Reid wrote that Squires had a job in 1904 as a conductor on Boston's electric railway.  When a drunk passenger refused to pay his fare, Squires grabbed him by the nape of the neck and the trousers and threw him to the ground.  A lawsuit filed by the man was dismissed, but Squires was dismissed by the company with the comment, "You are too strong for us; come back next year."

Squires became a star as a senior in 1905 and was selected as a consensus All-American at the end of the season.  In the years prior to the establishment of professional football as a major sport, selection as one of the eleven players on the All-American team marked the highest level of accomplishment in the sport. Squires won the All-American honor despite having broken his thumb in a game against Bates College.  As a senior in 1905, Squires was also selected as the captain of the Harvard football team, the first time a citizen of a country other than the United States received the honor.  At the time, the Philadelphia Inquirer reportedBeaton H. Squires, Harvard's giant guard may be elected captain of the football eleven next year.  It will be the first time that a man who is not a citizen of the United States will lead a Harvard football squad.
On the eve of his election as Harvard's captain, a New York newspaper noted that, despite growing up in rural Newfoundland and not being a society man, his skill and leadership on the field supported his candidacy
Born and reared in the country, the big fellow was proof against every accident.  No matter how hard he was used he never seemed to mind it in the least, and fairly grew fat on the same diet which left others sprawling behind him on the ground.  The reason undoubtedly was that the other men were nearly all city boys.  Squires' steady and consistent work makes him a leading candidate for the captaincy next year, despite the fact that he is in no sense of the word a society man.
In its coverage of the 1905 Harvard-Yale game, the Philadelphia Inquirer compared the "sturdy Squires" to a steam shovel smashing into the Yale line.

Editorial opposing the elimination of college football
During the 1905 season, while Squires was captain of the Harvard team, a national debate erupted over the violent nature of the sport of football.  Harvard's president, Charles William Eliot, proposed eliminating the sport from college campuses, and even President Theodore Roosevelt, a Harvard alumnus, weighed in on the debate.  In an editorial published in The Boston Journal, Squires wrote in support of the sport.  Squires argued: "Let football alone.  It is a grand game, a game which requires all the best qualities a man should possess, strength, endurance, quick perception, and self-control."  Squires supported rule changes to reduce the likelihood of serious injury, including a 20-yard penalty for unnecessary roughness, creation of a body of officials to more clearly define unnecessary roughness, use of two umpires to more carefully watch for unnecessary roughness, a ban on tackling below the knees, and creation of a five-yard safe zone for a player catching the ball.  However, Squires opposed proposals to more dramatically alter the rules of the game, noting, "You cannot make a parlor game out of football."

Legal practice

After receiving his law degree, Squires practiced as a lawyer in Boston from 1908-1912.  He moved to Saskatoon in 1913 where he became one of the leading lawyers in Saskatchewan.  In 1923, Squires and Andrew Sibbald formed a partnership that became the law firm of Squires & Sibbald.

Football coach and family
In addition to his legal practice, Squires served as head football coach for the University of Saskatoon Huskies in 1919.

Squires married Edith Louise Gaffield, a native of Brookline, Massachusetts, in 1913.

References

 Biography of Beaton H. Squires

1881 births
All-American college football players
American football tackles
Harvard Crimson football players
Harvard Law School alumni
Lawyers in Saskatchewan
Sportspeople from Saskatoon
Newfoundland Colony people
People from Newfoundland (island)
Year of death missing
Gridiron football people from Newfoundland and Labrador
Canadian players of American football